Rachelle Campbell (born 30 October 1956) is a Canadian sprinter. She competed in the women's 400 metres at the 1976 Summer Olympics. She won a gold medal in the 1975 Pan American Games 4 × 400 metres Relay (with Joyce Sadowick, Margaret McGowen and Joanne McTaggart). Campbell also won a bronze medal in the 4 x 400 metres relay at the 1978 Commonwealth Games.

References

External links
 

1956 births
Living people
Athletes (track and field) at the 1976 Summer Olympics
Canadian female sprinters
Olympic track and field athletes of Canada
Athletes (track and field) at the 1975 Pan American Games
Pan American Games gold medalists for Canada
Pan American Games medalists in athletics (track and field)
Athletes (track and field) at the 1978 Commonwealth Games
Commonwealth Games bronze medallists for Canada
Commonwealth Games medallists in athletics
Sportspeople from Guelph
Medalists at the 1975 Pan American Games
Olympic female sprinters
Medallists at the 1978 Commonwealth Games